Celaenorrhinus nigropunctata is a species of butterfly in the family Hesperiidae. It is found in Central Africa from Cameroon to Uganda.

Subspecies
Celaenorrhinus nigropunctata nigropunctata (Congo, Democratic Republic of the Congo, western Uganda)
Celaenorrhinus nigropunctata netta Evans, 1937 (Cameroon)

References

Butterflies described in 1908
nigropunctata